Emma Nuutinen (born 7 December 1996) is a Finnish ice hockey player,  playing in the Premier Hockey Federation (PHF) with the Buffalo Beauts. As a member of the Finnish women's national ice hockey team, she participated in both the 2014 and 2018 Winter Olympics and won bronze at the 2018 Olympic Games.

Playing career
Nuutinen began her NCAA Division I career in 2016–17, playing her freshman season with the North Dakota Fighting Hawks women's ice hockey program of the Western Collegiate Hockey Association (WCHA) conference. Forced to transfer after the University of North Dakota (UND) abruptly ended its women's ice hockey program following the 2016–17 season, Nuutinen and teammates Vilma Tanskanen and Kennedy Blair joined the Mercyhurst Lakers women's ice hockey program of the College Hockey America (CHA).

On 29 October 2020, the NHL shared a video across its social media platforms of Nuutinen performing a trick shot at the Käpylän urheilupuisto in Helsinki, which received a substantial and positive response. A day later, it was announced that Nuutinen had signed a contract with Kiekko-Espoo of the Naisten Liiga through the end of January 2021. She appeared in six games during the 2020–21 Naisten Liiga season, notching 7 goals and 5 assists (12).

In 2021, Nuutinen played football for the Fighting Knights of Lynn University, scoring two goals and recording one assist in seven appearances for the team.

International play
Nuutinen made three appearances for the Finland women's national under-18 ice hockey team, at the IIHF World Women's U18 Championships, with the first in 2012. In 2013, she was named a Media All Star as one of the top forwards in the tournament.

Nuutinen was selected to the Finnish national team for the 2014 Winter Olympics. She was the youngest player on the team. She played in all six games of the women's ice hockey tournament, scoring one goal. In 2018, she also appeared in all six games notching one goal and one assist.

Between Olympic appearances, Nuutinen has represented Finland in IIHF competition as part of the national team, earning World Championship bronze medals in 2015 and 2017. In 2019, she was a member of the historic silver medal winning Finnish national team at the 2019 IIHF Women's World Championship, the first team to break the Canada-United States lock on World Championship gold and silver.

Personal life 
Nuutinen is one of five siblings.  As of the 2020–21 season, her younger sister Sofia (born 2002) plays with Kiekko-Espoo in the Naisten Liiga and her younger sister Ella (born 2000) played with the Espoo Blues and Espoo United of the Naisten SM-sarja before ending her hockey career after the 2016–17 season.

Career statistics

Regular season and playoffs 

Sources: Elite Prospects, Finnish Ice Hockey Association, USCHO

International

Honours and achievements

References

External links

1996 births
Living people
Finnish women's ice hockey forwards
Finnish women's footballers
Buffalo Beauts players
Espoo Blues Naiset players
Finnish expatriate ice hockey players in the United States
Ice hockey players at the 2014 Winter Olympics
Ice hockey players at the 2018 Winter Olympics
Kiekko-Espoo Naiset players
Women's association football forwards
Finnish expatriate footballers
Expatriate women's soccer players in the United States
Lynn Fighting Knights women's soccer players
Medalists at the 2018 Winter Olympics
Mercyhurst Lakers women's ice hockey players
North Dakota Fighting Hawks women's ice hockey players
Olympic ice hockey players of Finland
Olympic bronze medalists for Finland
Olympic medalists in ice hockey
Sportspeople from Vantaa